Song Aimin (born February 7, 1978, in Hengshui, Hebei) is a Chinese discus thrower.

At the 2004 Summer Olympics she was eliminated in the first round of the discus throw competition.

Her personal best throw is 65.33 metres, achieved in May 2003 in Shijiazhuang. The Chinese, and Asian, record is currently held by Xiao Yanling with 71.68 metres.

Achievements

References

profile 

1978 births
Living people
Athletes (track and field) at the 2004 Summer Olympics
Athletes (track and field) at the 2008 Summer Olympics
Chinese female discus throwers
Olympic athletes of China
People from Hengshui
Asian Games medalists in athletics (track and field)
Athletes from Hebei
Athletes (track and field) at the 2002 Asian Games
Athletes (track and field) at the 2006 Asian Games
Athletes (track and field) at the 2010 Asian Games
Universiade medalists in athletics (track and field)
Asian Games gold medalists for China
Asian Games silver medalists for China
Olympic bronze medalists for China
Olympic bronze medalists in athletics (track and field)
Medalists at the 2008 Summer Olympics
Medalists at the 2002 Asian Games
Medalists at the 2006 Asian Games
Medalists at the 2010 Asian Games
Universiade silver medalists for China
Medalists at the 2005 Summer Universiade
21st-century Chinese women